The Zambia Super League, known as the MTN Super League for sponsorship purposes, is the top association football league created in 1962 by the Football Association of Zambia. The winners of the league each season receives ZMW500,000 ($26,414.20) and a copper trophy engraved with their team name.

Format
The league is contested by 18 teams every season. Until 2018, it was scheduled to run within the calendar year from March to December. Since then, owing to the decision by CAF on 20 July 2017 to switch from their traditional across-year runtime/schedule of their club competitions to align with that of the UEFA/European calendar, it currently runs from August to May.

At the conclusion of each season and assuming Zambia is among the top 12 countries in the current CAF 5-Year Ranking system, the top 4 teams will qualify for CAF competitions; the top 2 qualifies for the CAF Champions League and the two teams finishing below the top 2 positions on the league table qualifies for the CAF Confederation Cup. The teams who finish in the final 3 positions of the table are relegated to the National Division One league and replaced with the teams who finish in the top 3 positions of the National Division One league table.

Broadcasting
The league's broadcaster since 2007 is South Africa-based SuperSport, which telecasts 126 of the current 306 matches each season, all outside Southern Africa. Seven matches were added to the telecast schedule since the current season.

Sponsorship
In 2018, FAZ struck a deal with the MTN Group of South Africa to sponsor the league being worth initially $4 million (ZMW 7,571,280) for 5 years which has since been extended till date. Via telecasting the league on SuperSport, the prize money given to each league team is ZMW300,000 ($ 15,848.52). The league runners-up receives ZMW 350,000 ($ 18,489.94) and the other 16 teams receive ZMW 200,000 ($ 10,565.68).

2022–23 clubs

Buildcon
Forest Rangers
Green Buffaloes
Green Eagles
Kabwe Warriors
Nchanga Rangers
Lumwana Radiants
Kafue Celtic
Maestro United
NAPSA Stars
Nkana
Nkwazi
Power Dynamos
Prison Leopards 
Red Arrows
Chambishi
Zanaco
ZESCO United

Previous winners
The previous league winners are as follows:

1962: Roan United (Luanshya)
1963: Mufulira Wanderers (Mufulira)
1964: City of Lusaka (Lusaka)
1965: Mufulira Wanderers (Mufulira)
1966: Mufulira Wanderers (Mufulira)
1967: Mufulira Wanderers (Mufulira)
1968: Kabwe Warriors (Kabwe)
1969: Mufulira Wanderers (Mufulira)
1970: Kabwe Warriors (Kabwe)
1971: Kabwe Warriors (Kabwe)
1972: Kabwe Warriors (Kabwe)
1973: Zambia Army (Lusaka)
1974: Zambia Army (Lusaka)
1975: Green Buffaloes (Lusaka)
1976: Mufulira Wanderers (Mufulira)
1977: Green Buffaloes (Lusaka)
1978: Mufulira Wanderers (Mufulira)
1979: Green Buffaloes (Lusaka)
1980: Nchanga Rangers (Chingola)
1981: Green Buffaloes (Lusaka)
1982: Nkana (Kitwe)
1983: Nkana (Kitwe)
1984: Power Dynamos (Kitwe)
1985: Nkana (Kitwe)
1986: Nkana (Kitwe)
1987: Kabwe Warriors (Kabwe)
1988: Nkana (Kitwe)
1989: Nkana (Kitwe)
1990: Nkana (Kitwe)
1991: Power Dynamos (Kitwe)
1992: Nkana (Kitwe)
1993: Nkana (Kitwe)
1994: Power Dynamos (Kitwe)
1995: Mufulira Wanderers (Mufulira)
1996: Mufulira Wanderers (Mufulira)
1997: Power Dynamos (Kitwe)
1998: Nchanga Rangers (Chingola)
1999: Nkana (Kitwe)
2000: Power Dynamos (Kitwe)
2001: Nkana (Kitwe)
2002: Zanaco (Lusaka)
2003: Zanaco (Lusaka)
2004: Red Arrows (Lusaka)
2005: Zanaco (Lusaka)
2006: Zanaco (Lusaka)
2007: ZESCO United (Ndola)
2008: ZESCO United (Ndola)
2009: Zanaco (Lusaka)
2010: ZESCO United (Ndola)
2011: Power Dynamos (Kitwe)
2012: Zanaco (Lusaka)
2013: Nkana (Kitwe)
2014: ZESCO United (Ndola)
2015: ZESCO United (Ndola)
2016: Zanaco (Lusaka)
2017: ZESCO United (Ndola)
2018: ZESCO United (Ndola)
2019: ZESCO United (Ndola)
2019–20: Nkana (Kitwe)
2020–21: ZESCO United (Ndola)
2021–22: Red Arrows (Lusaka)

Performances by club

Top scorers

References

External links
 
 League profile (Archived) at the now-defunct MTNFootball.com
 League profile (Archived) at FIFA.com
 League History & Records via RSSSF

 
Football competitions in Zambia
Zambia
Sports leagues established in 1962
1962 establishments in Northern Rhodesia
Football leagues in Zambia